The Susie P. Turner Double House is a historic building located in Des Moines, Iowa, United States.  This two-story duplex features a symmetrical facade, brick in various colors, decorative cast stone, and a fullwidth front porch that is supported by three brick columns.  Built in 1914, its significance is its combination of Prairie School architecture and American Craftsman styling. At the time it was constructed the double house was still a somewhat uncommon building type in Des Moines.  The house was listed on the National Register of Historic Places in 1998.

References 

Houses completed in 1914
Houses in Des Moines, Iowa
National Register of Historic Places in Des Moines, Iowa
Houses on the National Register of Historic Places in Iowa